Roger N. Beachy is an American biologist and member of the National Academy of Sciences who studies plant virology. He was the founding president of the Donald Danforth Plant Science Center in St. Louis, Missouri, and the first director of the National Institute of Food and Agriculture.

Birth, family and education 
Roger N. Beachy was born in 1944 in Plain City, Ohio. His farther was a mennonite minister who left school in the 8th grade. He became interested in plant biology as a high school student at Bethany Christian Schools in Goshen, Indiana. In 1966 he completed his BA from Goshen College in Goshen, Indiana. He then pursued a Ph.D. in plant pathology from Michigan State University graduating in 1973. After defending his dissertation, Beachy began a postdoc in the lab of Milton Zaitlin at the University of Arizona but he was only there for nine months when Prof. Zaitlin moved the entire research group to Cornell University, where Beachy remained for another four years.

He is a second cousin of Stanford biologist Philip A. Beachy and historian Robert M. Beachy, and is also a relative of author Stephen Beachy.

Academic career 

In 1978 Beachy was hired as an assistant professor in the Biology Department of Washington University in St. Louis. He remained at Washington University, being promoted to associate and then full professor and becoming the head of the Center for Plant Science and Biotechnology, until 1991. From 1991 to 1998 he was the head of the Plant Biology division of Scripps Research Institute. In 1999 he was recruited to be the inaugural president of the Donald Danforth Plant Science Center in St. Louis, MO as well as resuming his appointment was Washington University. He left the Danforth Center in 2009 when he was appointed as the director of the National Institute of Food and Agriculture by President Obama, a role he served in until 2011. He also served on the Life Sciences jury for the Infosys Prize in 2009. From 2014-2020 he was a member of the National Science Board.

Research 
Beachy is an expert in plant virology and biotechnology of plants. He established principles for the genetic engineering of plants, that make them resistant to viral diseases.

His research at Washington University in St. Louis, in collaboration with Monsanto Company, led to the development of the world’s first genetically modified food crop, a variety of tomato that was modified for resistance to virus disease.  He demonstrated pathogen-derived resistance in plants and produced the first disease-resistant transgenic plant. He also showed that by transferring and expressing the coat protein gene of a virus in plants (coat protein-mediated resistance - CP-MR), these transgenic plants become resistant to viral infection. His discovery of the CP-MR led to the development of virus-resistant varieties of potato, tomato, pepper, cucumber, squash, sugar beets, papaya and plum.

Awards and honors 

 Fellow of the American Association for the Advancement of Science (1987)
 Elected a member of the National Academy of Sciences in 1997.
 Recipient of the 2001 Wolf Prize in Agriculture with James E. Womack "for the use of recombinant DNA technology, to revolutionize plant and animal sciences, paving the way for applications to neighboring fields".

Notes

External links 
 Interview with Roger Beachy
Roger Beachy's Seminar: "Plant Viruses and Crops"

Living people
1944 births
21st-century American biologists
Michigan State University alumni
Washington University in St. Louis faculty
Scripps Research faculty
Members of the United States National Academy of Sciences
Foreign Fellows of the Indian National Science Academy
Wolf Prize in Agriculture laureates